Judge Waters may refer to:

Hugh Franklin Waters (1932–2002), judge of the United States District Court for the Western District of Arkansas
Laughlin Edward Waters Sr. (1914–2002), judge of the United States District Court for the Central District of California

See also
Susan P. Watters (born 1958), judge of the United States District Court for the District of Montana